Drunk Bus is a 2020 American comedy-drama film directed by John Carlucci and Brandon LaGanke and starring Charlie Tahan and Kara Hayward. It is Carlucci and LaGanke's directorial debut. The film was released on May 20, 2021, and received positive reviews from critics.

Plot 
Michael is a young college graduate who is stuck working as a bus driver for a party school in Ohio after failing to achieve his dream of becoming a writer. He spends his nights driving the "drunk bus," which shuttles intoxicated students from parties back to their dorms.

One night, while driving the bus, Michael encounters Pineapple, a security guard who starts to offer Michael some advice on how to navigate his life. As they spend more time together, Michael and Pineapple form an unlikely friendship, and Michael begins to see his life in a new light.

At the same time, Michael is also dealing with the aftermath of a painful breakup and struggling to find his place in the world. As he grapples with these challenges, he must decide whether to continue his dead-end job or take a chance on his writing dreams and leave the "drunk bus" behind.

Cast
Charlie Tahan as Michael, a 20-something driver of a drunk bus
Kara Hayward as Kat, Michael's friend 
Pineapple Tangaroa as Pineapple, a bodyguard hired for Michael's bus after an altercation.
Zach Cherry as Josh, Michael's lazy roommate
Sarah Mezzanotte as Amy, Michael's ex-girlfriend
Dave Hill as Devo Ted, a drug dealer 
Tonatiuh Elizarraraz as Justin
Martin Pfefferkorn as FU Bob, an elderly passenger Michael helps.
Frank Iero as Hank Hero
Joe Napier as Justin's boyfriend
 Dresden Engle as Bus Driver
 Will Forte as Fred, Michael's boss at the depot (uncredited)

Production
Carlucci and LaGanke originally wanted to shoot the film in Kent, Ohio, where they are from, but were convinced by producer Eric Hollenbeck, a native of Elmira, New York, that Rochester, New York would be a cheaper option with a similar aesthetic. Principal photography began on March 1, 2019 in Rochester, and wrapped on March 18.

Release
The film was to have made its worldwide premiere at South by Southwest in March 2020.  However, the SXSW Festival was cancelled in response to the COVID-19 pandemic in the United States, thus postponing the premiere of Drunk Bus.  On October 15, 2020, the film premiered at the San Diego International Film Festival.

In January 2021, FilmRise acquired North American distribution rights to the film.

Reception
The website's critics consensus reads, "Fueled by a blend of rowdy comedy and poignant drama, Drunk Bus takes audiences on an uncommonly rewarding coming-of-age journey." According to Metacritic, which assigned a weighted average score of 65 out of 100 based on 11 critics, the film received "generally favorable reviews".

Sandy Schaefer of Screen Rant awarded the film three stars out of five, saying: "Thanks to its charming cast and even-handed blend of laughs and drama, Drunk Bus generally succeeds in putting a fresh spin on its familiar story."

Accolades 
Drunk Bus won the Best Narrative Feature Award from both the Jury and the Audience at the 2020 San Diego International Film Festival.

References

External links
 
 

2020 films
Films postponed due to the COVID-19 pandemic
American comedy-drama films
Films shot in New York (state)
2020 directorial debut films
2020 comedy-drama films
Films about buses
2020s English-language films
2020s American films